Hockeyclub Oranje-Rood, also known as HC Oranje-Rood or simply Oranje-Rood, is a Dutch field hockey club based in Eindhoven, North Brabant. The club was founded on 1 July 2016 as a merger of Oranje Zwart and  EMHC.

In May 2019, the first women's team won the club its first prize by winning the Dutch national cup, the Gold Cup.

Honours

Men
Euro Hockey League
 Runners-up (1): 2016–17

Women
Gold Cup
 Winners (1): 2018–19

Current squad

Men's squad
Head coach: Jeroen Baart

References

External links
 Official website

 
Sports clubs in Eindhoven
Dutch field hockey clubs
Field hockey clubs established in 2016
2016 establishments in the Netherlands